The enzyme L(+)-tartrate dehydratase catalyzes the chemical reaction

(R,R)-tartrate  oxaloacetate + H2O

This enzyme belongs to the family of lyases, specifically the hydro-lyases, which cleave carbon-oxygen bonds.  The systematic name of this enzyme class is (R,R)-tartrate hydro-lyase (oxaloacetate-forming). Other names in common use include tartrate dehydratase, tartaric acid dehydrase, L-tartrate dehydratase, L-(+)-tartaric acid dehydratase, and (R,R)-tartrate hydro-lyase.  This enzyme participates in glyoxylate and dicarboxylate metabolism.  It has 2 cofactors: iron,  and Thiol.

References

 

EC 4.2.1
Iron enzymes
Enzymes of unknown structure